Glen Oroua is a community in the Manawatu District and Manawatū-Whanganui region in New Zealand's central North Island.

Demographics

It had a population of 1,284 at the 2018 New Zealand census, an increase of 90 people (7.5%) since the 2013 census, and an increase of 123 people (10.6%) since the 2006 census. There were 465 households. There were 642 males and 642 females, giving a sex ratio of 1.0 males per female. The median age was 38 years (compared with 37.4 years nationally), with 330 people (25.7%) aged under 15 years, 174 (13.6%) aged 15 to 29, 597 (46.5%) aged 30 to 64, and 183 (14.3%) aged 65 or older.

Ethnicities were 93.7% European/Pākehā, 12.9% Māori, 1.4% Pacific peoples, 1.4% Asian, and 2.1% other ethnicities (totals add to more than 100% since people could identify with multiple ethnicities).

The proportion of people born overseas was 7.9%, compared with 27.1% nationally.

Although some people objected to giving their religion, 54.2% had no religion, 36.9% were Christian, 0.2% were Hindu, 0.2% were Buddhist and 1.2% had other religions.

Of those at least 15 years old, 159 (16.7%) people had a bachelor or higher degree, and 225 (23.6%) people had no formal qualifications. The median income was $37,000, compared with $31,800 nationally. The employment status of those at least 15 was that 546 (57.2%) people were employed full-time, 171 (17.9%) were part-time, and 24 (2.5%) were unemployed.

Education

References

Populated places in Manawatū-Whanganui
Manawatu District